Procryphalus is a genus of typical bark beetles in the family Curculionidae. There are about seven described species in Procryphalus.

Species
These seven species belong to the genus Procryphalus:
 Procryphalus aceris Hopkins, 1915b
 Procryphalus fraxini Wood & Bright, 1992
 Procryphalus idahoensis Hopkins, 1915b
 Procryphalus mucronatus (LeConte, 1879)
 Procryphalus populi Hopkins, 1915b
 Procryphalus salicis Hopkins, 1915b
 Procryphalus utahensis Hopkins, 1915

References

Further reading

 
 
 

Scolytinae
Articles created by Qbugbot